"Rough God Goes Riding" is the opening song on the album, The Healing Game by Northern Irish singer-songwriter Van Morrison. The song reached No. 168 on the UK charts. One of the B-sides of the single, the alternative version of "The Healing Game", appears on all three editions of Morrison's 2007 compilation album Still on Top - The Greatest Hits. The other B-side "At the End of the Day" was released as a bonus track on the 2008 reissue of The Healing Game.

Song analysis
According to biographer Clinton Heylin this song: "signalled a return to the religious and spiritual preoccupations that had driven Morrison's work throughout the eighties, the image of the Rough God being derived from Robin Williamson's 'Mr. Thomas' — recorded by Morrison for Inarticulate — in which 'the rough God goes riding with his shears', a reference to the avenging Messiah who shall return to wreak final judgement on Man."

Greil Marcus wrote that "The deep burr of Morrison's voice buries the words, which cease to matter; you might not hear them until the tenth time you play the album, or long after that. 'It's when that rough god goes riding,' he sings, drawing the words both from Yeats and down in his chest, and you might never know it's the Angel of Death that has you in its embrace."

Appearance on other albums
"Rough God Goes Riding" has been included as one of fourteen songs on the last disc of the limited 3 disc edition of the 2007 compilation album, Still on Top - The Greatest Hits. It is the only song from the album included on 2015 compilation The Essential Van Morrison.

On the 2015 album Duets: Re-working the Catalogue, Van Morrison performs the song as a duet with his daughter Shana Morrison.

Other performances
A performance of the song, featuring special guests Candy Dulfer and Fred Wesley, was shown on the 1998 Rockpalast Christmas special on German television.

Personnel on original release
Van Morrison – vocal, harmonica
Robin Aspland – piano
Alec Dankworth – double bass
Geoff Dunn – drums
Pee Wee Ellis – baritone saxophone
Leo Green – tenor saxophone
Ronnie Johnson – electric guitar
Brian Kennedy – background vocals
Katie Kissoon – background vocals

Notes

References

Heylin, Clinton (2003). Can You Feel the Silence? Van Morrison: A New Biography, Chicago Review Press 
Marcus, Greil (2010).  When That Rough God Goes Riding: Listening to Van Morrison, Public Affairs, 

1997 singles
Van Morrison songs
Songs written by Van Morrison
Song recordings produced by Van Morrison
1996 songs